Cystopteris chinensis is a species of fern in the family Cystopteridaceae. It was formerly placed as the sole species in the genus Cystoathyrium, not recognized in the Pteridophyte Phylogeny Group classification of 2016 (PPG I). The forest in Sichuan, China from which the species was originally described in 1963 has since disappeared, and only one individual plant of this species was found in the remaining bush.

References

chinensis
Endemic flora of China
Taxobox binomials not recognized by IUCN 
Taxa named by Ren-Chang Ching